Willoughby Wittenham Rees Goddard (4 July 1926 – 11 April 2008) was an English actor whose trademark rotund figure was well known on television and in films for more than 40 years.

Biography
Goddard was born in Bicester, Oxfordshire. He played Mr. Bumble in two versions of Charles Dickens's Oliver Twist – a 1962 television adaptation, and the original Broadway production of the musical Oliver!. He originated the role of Cardinal Wolsey in the West End production of Robert Bolt's A Man for All Seasons. He appeared in the television series The Adventures of William Tell (which lasted 39 episodes) in 1958 and 1959 as the villain Landburgher Gessler and as Sir Geoffrey in The Man in Room 17, which ran two series of 13 hour-long black-and-white episodes in 1965 and 1966. He was cast as Reeder's boss, Sir Jason Toovey, (head of the Department of Public Prosecutions) in The Mind of Mr. J.G. Reeder, a TV series of 16 hour-long episodes with first season 1969 and second season 1971 based on short stories by Edgar Wallace.

Goddard retired from the industry in 1987 and died in 2008, aged 81.

Goddard is buried in Teddington Cemetery.

Filmography

Film appearances
 Bait (1950) - John Hartley
 The Million Pound Note (1950) - Stockbroker (uncredited)
 The Green Man (1956) - Statesman
 A Touch of the Sun (1956) - Golightly
 Stranger in Town (1957) - Publican
 Heart of a Child (1958) - Scott
 In the Wake of a Stranger (1959) - Shafto
 Inn for Trouble (1960) - Sgt Saunders
 The Millionairess (1961) - President
 The Secret Partner (1961) - Hotel Kepper
 Double Bunk (1961) - Prospective Purchaser
 The Long Shadow (1961) - Schober
 Fate Takes a Hand (1961) - Rollenshaw
 The Golden Rabbit (1962) - Clitheroe
 Carry On Cruising (1962) - Large Man
 The Wrong Box (1966) - James White Wragg
 The Charge of the Light Brigade (1968) - Squire
 Laughter in the Dark (1969) - Colonel
 The Juggler of Notre Dame (1970) - Judge Broadbottom
 The Canterbury Tales (1971) - Placebo
 Gawain and the Green Knight (1973) - Knight
 Joseph Andrews (1977) - Fourposter Innkeeper
 Jabberwocky (1977) - Eggman (uncredited)
 Quincy's Quest (1979) - General
 Young Sherlock Holmes (1985) - School Reverend
 God's Outlaw (1986) - Cardinal Wolsey

TV appearances
 David Copperfield (1956) - Mr. Creakle
 The Buccaneers (1956) - Phineas Bunch – "Marooned"
 The Buccaneers (1956) - Lawyer Pym – "Blood Will Tell"
 Gay Cavalier (1957) - Bulstrode – "Dragon's Heart"
 The Adventures of William Tell (1958–1959) - Landburger Gessler – regular cast
 The Invisible Man (1961) - Crowther – "Bank Raid"
 Charlesworth (1959) - Calvarez1 
 Danger Man (1961) - McFadden – "The Journey Ends Halfway"
 Oliver Twist (1962) - Mr. Bumble
 Ghost Squad (1963) - Slim Salmon – "The Missing People"
 Richard the Lionheart (1963) - Arnold – "The Lord of Kenak"
 Public Eye (1965) - Chambers – "A Harsh World for Zealots"
 The Man in Room 17 (1965–1966) - Sir Geoffrey – regular cast
 The Baron (1967) - Colbert - "The Edge of Fear"
 The Saint (1969) - (ex) King Boris – "The Ex-King of Diamonds"
 The Mind of Mr. J.G. Reeder (1969) - Sir Jason Toovey – regular cast
 The Main Chance (1969) – What About Justice?
 Orson Welles Great Mysteries (1973) - Sir Thomas  "Captain Rogers"
 The Sweeney (1976) - Kitter – "Sweet Smell of Succession"
 Space: 1999 (1977) - The Taybor – "The Taybor"
 The Famous Five (1978) - The Man - "Five go to Mystery Moor"
 My Son, My Son (1979) -  Mr. Moscrop
 The Incredible Mr Tanner (1981) - Tom
 The Black Adder (1983) - The Archbishop – "The Queen Of Spain's Beard"
 John Silver's Return to Treasure Island (1986) - Sir Solomon Pridham – "The Map"
 Porterhouse Blue (1987) - Professor Siblington

References

External links 
 
 Obituary: Guardian
 Obituary: Independent

1926 births
2008 deaths
People from Bicester
English male film actors
English male television actors
English male stage actors